Molione is a genus of Asian comb-footed spiders that was first described by Tamerlan Thorell in 1892.

Species
 it contains six species, all found in Asia:
Molione christae Yoshida, 2003 – Borneo
Molione kinabalu Yoshida, 2003 – China, Borneo
Molione lemboda Gao & Li, 2010 – China
Molione triacantha Thorell, 1892 (type) – India, China, Laos, Malaysia, Singapore, Taiwan
Molione trispinosa (O. Pickard-Cambridge, 1873) – Sri Lanka
Molione uniacantha Wunderlich, 1995 – Malaysia, Indonesia (Sumatra)

See also
 List of Theridiidae species

References

Araneomorphae genera
Spiders of Asia
Taxa named by Tamerlan Thorell
Theridiidae